Richard Todd Julius is an information architect, software executive, and entrepreneur. He holds both American and Irish citizenship.

Early life 
Rich Julius was born in Buffalo, New York and was raised in central New Jersey by his stepfather, Don Bloom, the American painter and Guggenheim Fellow.  He received BA degrees in English, Comparative Literature, and Arts & Ideas from the University of Michigan, Ann Arbor, where he later received an MFA in Creative Writing and subsequently served on the faculty of the Department of English, before his career in Silicon Valley high-tech.

Career

Silicon Valley 
Rich Julius worked for PeopleSoft in 1992-93 and was a founding member of the PeopleSoft band, the Raving Daves. He went on to work at Oracle Corporation in 1993 where he became director of user assistance, and later joined Informix in 1996 as director of knowledge systems. At Informix he developed Answers OnLine, an external tech support web site that leveraged visualization software from Perspecta, a start-up venture cofounded by Nicholas Negroponte and other veterans of MIT's Media Lab, including Lisa Strausfeld.

In 1995 he founded the technical communication program at the UC Berkeley Extension, where he taught information architecture and digital communication courses. He also served for three years as president of the Berkeley chapter of the Society for Technical Communication, receiving the Distinguished Chapter Service Award in 1994.

Specific Impulse 
In 1999 Julius co-founded Specific Impulse Inc., a Silicon Valley-based information architecture and web development firm, where he served as president until 2007. His projects included the iMarketing intranet system for Applied Materials, information architecture for Seagate Technologies, and the design and co-invention of StageOne™, a portal-builder framework. StageOne version 1 was first released on 31 July 2001 as a Software-as-a-Service (SaaS) platform. Julius continues to sit on the Specific Impulse board as chairman.

Crimson Consulting 
Julius became a partner and VP at Silicon Valley based Crimson Consulting Group in 2007, when Crimson Consulting acquired the Specific Impulse consulting practice. There Julius directed consulting projects for companies that included Cisco, McKesson, Microsoft, Seagate, and Verizon.

News industry 
In 2009 Julius became the CTO of DNAinfo.com, a hyperlocal online news agency based in Manhattan, founded and owned by the American billionaire J. Joseph Ricketts. He left DNAinfo in 2011 to co-found iMedia Revenue (Ireland) Ltd., a company that sells newsroom software and offers ways to commercialize newspapers' products online, where he serves as CEO. Julius is also the author of the BloggingWrites.com news industry blog.

IRS Oversight Board 
Julius was nominated by President Barack Obama in January 2015 to serve on the IRS Oversight Board, created by the Internal Revenue Service Restructuring and Reform Act of 1998 (appointment pending US Senate confirmation).

Personal life

References

External links 
Digital Technology Blog: Blogging Writes 
Civics Blog: LeaningBlue 

1959 births
Living people
Businesspeople from the San Francisco Bay Area
University of Michigan College of Literature, Science, and the Arts alumni
American chief executives